Jagadguru Ramanandacharya Swami Rambhadracharya is a Hindu religious leader, Sanskrit scholar and Katha artist based in Chitrakoot, India. Rambhadracharya is a spontaneous poet and writer in Sanskrit, Hindi, Awadhi, Maithili, and several other languages. He has authored more than 100 books and 50 papers, including four epic poems, a Hindi commentary on Tulsidas' Ramcharitmanas, a Sanskrit commentary in verse on the Ashtadhyayi, and Sanskrit commentaries on the Prasthanatrayi scriptures. He is regarded as one of the greatest authorities on Tulsidas in India, and is the editor of a critical edition of the Ramcharitmanas.

Many Sanskrit and Hindi authors have critiqued and reviewed the works and the literary style of Rambhadracharya, prominent among them being Kalika Prasad Shukla, Rewa Prasad Dwivedi, Devarshi Kala Nath Shastry and Abhiraj Rajendra Mishra. In his conversations and speeches, Rambhadracharya often employs extemporaneously composed  verses in Upajāti metre and the Daṇḍaka style with long adjectives. In his poems, the three classical styles of Pāñcālī, Vaidarbhī and Lāṭī are dominant. Some distinguishing features of his Sanskrit poetry include use of rhyme (Antyānuprāsa), employment of a variety of metres including many Prakrit and Hindi metres, new usages, and the Gīti style. Rambhadracharya is credited with reviving the letter-poem (Patrakāvya) genre in Sanskrit after 2000 years. His Sanskrit commentaries have a broad coverage with theories supported by evidence, novel interpretations, elaborate derivations, and an independent style with quotes from the works of Tulsidas accompanied by Sanskrit poetic translations. His Hindi lyrical works follow the Bhojpuri tradition with emphasis on both the aesthetics and emotion. Optimism, devotion to motherland, and patriotism are some more features of his works which are seen in several poems and plays.

Overview
Rewa Prasad Dwivedi writes in his Sanskrit poem dedicated to Rambhadracharya that he is an encyclopedia of learning whose literature is like numerous Narmada rivers flowing out simultaneously, and in whose literary works Shiva and Parvati delight while performing Tandava and Lasya.

Devarshi Kala Nath Shastry writes in his review of Rambhadracharya's works that Rambhadracharya is an accomplished and eloquent poet who is the foremost among scholars and is also well-versed in all scriptures. Shastry writes that among Sanskrit poets, only Śrīharṣa (poet of Naiṣadhīyacaritam) has been described as having such wonderful command over Sanskrit as Rambhadracharya has.

Features
Shastry writes that Rambhadracharya even talks in extemporaneously composed poetry with Sanskrit scholars, usually in the Upajāti metre. Rambhadracharya uses with great effect the Daṇḍaka style with Sanskrit adjectives in his speeches. Shastry recounts a use of a long sentence in the Daṇḍaka style at a speech in Jaipur in July 2003 by Rambhadracharya, in which one sentence with multiple adjectives lasted around seven minutes and was "replete with poetic beauty".

Shastry says that rhyme (Antyānuprāsa) is a distinguishing feature of Rambhadracharya's Sanskrit poetry. Shastry notes that another feature of Rambhadracharya's works is the devotion to motherland and patriotism, which is most evident in the poetic work Ājādacandraśekharacaritam on the life of Chandrashekhar Azad. Shastry says that this strong feeling of love towards motherland is reminiscent of old Sanskrit literature including Prithvi Sukta of Atharva Veda, various Puranas including Bhagavata Purana, and also in the Sanskrit works of Swami Bhagavadacharya, a former Jagadguru Ramanandacharya.

Dinkar notes that in the poems of Rambhadracharya, the three poetical styles of Pāñcālī (secondary figurative sense with short and sweet-sounding compounds), Vaidarbhī (with compounds and soft contexts and without many figures of speech) and Lāṭī (with precise contexts and without many figures of speech) are dominant.

Rasas
The principal Rasa (emotion or mood) of Śrībhārgavarāghavīyam is the Vīra Rasa (the emotion of heroism). Like the previously composed Mahākāvyas, Śrībhārgavarāghavīyam has all the eight Rasas as enunciated by Bharata Muni. These Rasas are – Śringāra (eros and beauty), Vīra (heroism or bravery), Hāsya (mirth), Raudra (fury), Karuṇa (compassion), Bībhatsa (disgust), Bhayānaka (horror), Adbhuta (amazement). Apart from this Śrībhārgavarāghavīyam also has the ninth Rasa as propounded by Mammaṭa – the Śānta Rasa (calmness), and the three new Rasas as – Bhakti (devotion), Vatsala (parental love) and Preyas (love). The principle Rasas in the Ashtavakra (epic) are the Vīra and the Karuṇa. Like the 10th canto of Śrīmad Bhāgavatam and Bālakāṇḍa of the Rāmacaritamānasa, twelve verses in the seventeenth canto (17.42–17.53) of Śrībhārgavarāghavīyam have all the twelve Rasas used in the same context. While the pure Śṛngāra Rasa is the dominant Rasa in Bhṛṅgadūtam, Śrīsītārāmakelikaumudī is a work primarily of Vātsalya Rasa mixed with Śṛngāra Rasa. Rāghavagītaguñjana and Bhaktigītasudhā are works full of the Bhakti Rasa.

Styles of individual works

Śrībhārgavarāghavīyam
Shastry critiqued the work Śrībhārgavarāghavīyam in the January 2003 issue of the Sanskrit monthly Bhāratī. Shastry writes that the work has poetic excellence, variety of meters and dexterity of language which has not been seen hitherto in Sanskrit epics. Shastry finds the twentieth canto of the epic to be an excellent illustration of Sanskrit poetry in Prakrit verses, a style which was pioneered by Shastry's father, Bhatt Mathuranath Shastri. The 20th canto has 63 Sanskrit verses (20.1–20.63) composed in Prakrit metres, namely Kirīṭa (Meduradanta, a type of Sapādikā), Ghanākṣarī, Duramilā (Dvimilā, a type of Sapādikā), Mattagajendra (a type of Sapādikā), Śaṭpada and Harigītaka. The language of the verses in Sanskrit, but the metres and the prosody rules follow Prakrit prosody. An example is the following verse (20.13) in the Ghanākṣarī metre, which consists of 32 syllables in every foot.

Dr. Brajesh Dikshit, Sanskrit scholar from Jabalpur, says that Śrībhārgavarāghavīyam combines the styles of three previous Sanskrit epics - it has two leading characters like in Bhāravi's Kirātārjunīyam, the poetic excellence and variety of prosodic metres is like in Śrīharṣa's Naiṣadhīyacaritam, while the length and extent of the work is like the Śiśupālavadham of Māgha.

Abhiraj Rajendra Mishra, former Vice-Chancellor of Sampurnanand Sanskrit University wrote in the introduction to Śrībhārgavarāghavīyam that the epic nourishes the tradition of Ṛṣis, and with this composition the contemporary Sanskrit literature has been blessed.

Śrīrāghavakṛpābhāṣyam
Dr. Shivram Sharma, Sanskrit scholar from Varanasi, writes in his review of Śrīrāghavakṛpābhāṣyam on the eleven Upanishads that it is replete with novel thoughts and Sanskrit derivations, and that Rambhadracharya has shown Rama as the Pratipādya of the all Upanishads by the wonderful dexterity of Vyutpattis of Sanskrit words. Sharma adds that the style of interspersed Sanskrit translations of the works of Tulsidas further enhances the literary merit of the work. Dr. Vishnu Dutt Rakesh, Hindi professor and author from Haridwar, says that the Śrīrāghavakṛpābhāṣyam on Bhagavad Gita has the broadest coverage of all Sanskrit commentaries on Gita with "convincing discussion, propounding of theories with evidence, contradiction of others, creative genius and an independent style of composition". Dikshit says that the Śrīrāghavakṛpābhāṣyam on the Prasthānatrayī is formidable and adorns the Ramananda tradition with greatness. He adds that the Śrīrāghavakṛpābhāṣyam on Narada Bhakti Sutra and Śrīrāmastavarājastotram are successful in establishing the five Prasthānas in place of the three Prasthānas of Prasthānatrayī. Dr. Ram Chandra Prasad, author of bilingual English and Hindi commentaries on the Ramcharitmanas, says that the Mahavīrī commentary is "adorned with erudition" and considers it to be "the best exposition of Hanuman Chalisa."

Other works
Kalika Prasad Shukla was one of the examiners of the PhD dissertation of Rambhadracharya (then known as Giridhar Mishra) in 1981. After examining his Sanskrit thesis titled Adhyātmarāmāyaṇe Apāṇinīyaprayogānāṃ Vimarśaḥ (Deliberation on the non-Paninian usages in the Adhyatma Ramayana), he wrote a Sanskrit verse–

Kalanath Shastry also critiqued the work Bhṛṅgadūtam, about which he says that it has many new usages (Prayogas) not seen earlier in Sanskrit poetry. As per Shastry, new dimensions in Sanskrit literature are seen in the play Śrīrāghavābhyudayam where there are songs in the Gīti style, and Gītarāmāyaṇam which is an epic poem in the Gīti style of Gītagovindam by Jayadeva. Dikshit writes that Kubjāpatram is a revival of the letter-poem (Patrakāvya) genre in Sanskrit after 2000 years, and is the first work in Sanskrit literature whose lead character is disabled.

Dikshit is of the view that the eight Utprekṣā figures of speech in Śrīrāghavabhāvadarśanam have excelled the Utprekṣā style of the poet Karṇapūra, while the erudition and poetic skill displayed in Śrīsarayūlaharī makes the reader forget the Gaṅgālaharī of Paṇḍitarāja Jagannātha. He holds the work Arundhatī to be an eminent epic in Khariboli Hindi after the Kāmāyanī of Jaishankar Prasad. He observes that while Kāmāyanī goes from creation to optimism to pessimism and ends with indifference, Arundhatī is optimistic from beginning to end and establishes the virtues of Hinduism as enshrined in the Ramayana. About the lyrical Hindi works Rāghavagītaguñjana and Bhaktigītasudhā, Dikshit says that the works are steeped in Bhakti Rasa and are reminiscent of the works of Tulsidas, Surdas and Mirabai. On Bhaktigītasudhā, Shraddha Gupta writes that the work follows the Bhojpuri tradition where the sentimental and artistic aspects are both developed.

Dikshit says that the nationalistic play Śrīrāghavābhyudayam establishes Rambhadracharya as a successful playwright at a young age. Dikshit praises the aesthetics of the work Śrīsītārāmakelikaumudī saying that it represents all the six Sampradāyas of Indian literature (Rīti, Rasa, Alaṅkāra, Dhvani, Vakrokti and Aucitya), and that it is a unique work of Rambhadracharya when it comes to figures of speech. Dikshit says that this work places Rambhadracharya in the league of Ritikavya poets like Raskhan, Keshavdas, Ghananand and Padmakar; but observes the distinction that while the works of all these poets are primarily in the Śṛngāra Rasa, Śrīsītārāmakelikaumudī is a work which has Vātsalya Rasa as the primary emotion, which is augmented by Śṛngāra Rasa.

References

Works cited

External links
 

Style (fiction)
Indian literature